Tadeáš Hájek z Hájku (1 December 1525 in Prague – 1 September 1600 in Prague), also known as Tadeáš Hájek of Hájek, Thaddaeus Hagecius ab Hayek or Thaddeus Nemicus, was a Czech naturalist, personal physician of the Holy Roman Emperor Rudolph II and an astronomer in the Kingdom of Bohemia.

Biography

Tadeáš Hájek was the son of Šimon Hájek (ca. 1485–1551) from an old Prague family. He was ennobled in 1554 by Ferdinand I of Germany, knighted in 1571 by Maximilian II, later made knight of the Holy Roman Empire by Rudolf II. He had three wives, three sons, and one daughter.

In 1548–1549, he studied medicine and astronomy in Vienna and graduated in 1550, receiving his Masters "in artibus" in 1551. In 1554 he studied medicine in Bologna and went to Milan the same year to listen to lectures by Girolamo Cardano, but he soon returned to Prague, where he became a professor of mathematics at the Charles University of Prague in 1555.

He published the Aphorismi Metoposcopici in 1561, dealing with divination and diagnosis by interpreting lines on the forehead. He triangulated the area around Prague and co-authored a map of it in 1563; the map is unfortunately lost now. In 1564 he received the Emperor's privilege stating that no astrological prognostication could be printed in Prague before he had seen and approved it. In 1566–1570, he served as an army doctor in Austria and Hungary during the war with the Ottoman Empire. He published his studies of a supernova in the constellation Cassiopeia in 1572. Tadeáš Hájek was in frequent scientific correspondence with the recognized astronomer Tycho Brahe (1546–1601) and played an important role in persuading Rudolph II to invite Brahe (and later Kepler) to Prague.

His voluminous writings in Latin were mostly concerned with astronomy and many regarded him as the greatest astronomer of his time. Besides his work, Tadeáš Hájek eagerly collected manuscripts, especially those by Copernicus.

Throughout his life he also published numerous astrological prognostics in Czech and that is why he was until recently viewed as an "occultist" rather than a great scientist. He corresponded with John Dee as a result of their common interest in Euclid and geometry.

The lunar crater Hagecius and the asteroid 1995 Hajek are named in his honour.

Works

References 
  Thaddaeus Hagecius ab Hayck: Dialexis de novae et prius incognitae stellae inusitatae magnitudinis & splendidissimi luminis apparitione, & de eiusdem stellae vero loco constituendo, Frankfurt/Main, 1574, edit. Zdenek Horsky, Prague, 1967 
 Z. Horský: Thaddaeus Hagecius (1525 - 1600), Ríse hvezd, Vol. 56, p. 228 - 229., 1975 

1525 births
1600 deaths
Czech astronomers
Scientists from Prague
Academic staff of Charles University
Physicians from Prague